The 1887 New South Wales colonial election was held between 4 February and 26 February 1887. This election was for all of the 124 seats in the New South Wales Legislative Assembly and it was conducted in 37 single-member constituencies, 23 2-member constituencies, seven 3-member constituencies and five 4-member constituencies, all with a first past the post system. Part 1 (section 13) of the Electoral Act of 1880 had awarded the right to vote to 'every male subject of Her Majesty of the full age of twenty-one years and absolutely free being a natural born or naturalized'. The previous parliament of New South Wales was dissolved on 26 January 1887 by the Governor, Lord Carrington, on the advice of the Premier, Sir Henry Parkes.

Parkes had defeated the government of Patrick Jennings less than a week previously, and was keen to test his electoral strength. This was the first election at which there were recognisable political parties, namely the Protectionist Party, which coalesced around Jennings' successor George Dibbs, and Parkes' Free Trade Party. At this stage these parties were still organisationally very different from today's political parties, and party affiliation was often fluid or non-existent, depending on the individual member.

Key dates

Results

{{Australian elections/Title row
| table style = float:right;clear:right;margin-left:1em;
| title        = New South Wales colonial election, 4 – 26 February 1887
| house        = Legislative Assembly
| series       = New South Wales colonial election
| back         = 1885
| forward      = 1889
| enrolled     = 
| total_votes  = 128,787
| turnout %    = 57.84
| turnout chg  = −3.26
| informal     = 2,275
| informal %   = 1.74
| informal chg = −0.27
}}

|}

See also
 Members of the New South Wales Legislative Assembly, 1887–1889
 Candidates of the 1887 New South Wales colonial election

References

1887
1887 elections in Australia
1880s in New South Wales
February 1887 events